Grass mantis is a common name mostly given to various species of praying mantis that mimic grass or other slender vegetation.  Species to which this name has been applied include but are not limited to:
Glabromantis mexicana (Mexican grass mantis)
Odontomantis planiceps (grass mantis)
Oxyothespis dumonti (African grass mantis)
Thesprotia graminis (American grass mantis)
Schizocephala bicornis (Indian grass mantis)

See also
Dead leaf mantis
Flower mantis
Stick mantis
List of mantis genera and species

References

Mantodea
Insect common names